An object in digital image processing is an identifiable portion of an image that can be interpreted as a single unit.

Image processing